xplorer² (formerly 2xExplorer) is a dual-pane file manager for Microsoft Windows operating systems, developed by Nikos Bozinis (Nikolaos Achilleos Bozinis). It offers the functionality of orthodox file managers through an interface similar to the familiar Windows Explorer. Some of its features are tabbed file management within each pane, viewing and editing text files, searching for files using arbitrary criteria, the ability to compare and synchronize folders and the ability to perform queued or concurrent copy and move operations with error handling (robust file transfer). The file finder module is claimed to be “outclass” from other search tools.

Later versions support multi-folder browsing in side-by-side panels (aka Miller columns), detect duplicate and similar files and pictures to clean up hard disk space.

xplorer² comes in two paid varieties, professional and ultimate. The ultimate version is more expensive but includes a faster search engine (it integrates with Windows Search) and is portable (can be run off a USB stick)

Apart from the commercial version of the program, there is also a version which is free for personal and academic use. Three features of the Professional version not present in the Lite version are advanced search (Omni-Finder), full Unicode support and robust transfer.

xplorer² has been in constant development since 2002. Over the years there have been many independent reviews for xplorer². Lifehacker considered it the "best alternative file browser for windows" in a 2011 review, and many reviews rank it among the five best free replacements for Windows Explorer

See also
Comparison of file managers

References

External links
The home page of xplorer²
Official portable version
xplorer² / 2X Explorer Products Forum
zabkat YouTube channel with training videos

Orthodox file managers
Utilities for Windows